Nancy Jo Powell (born 1947, Cedar Falls, Iowa) was the United States Ambassador to India from April 2012 to May 2014.

Powell was Director General of the United States Foreign Service, a position she assumed after serving as the U.S. Ambassador to Nepal. Powell is a career member of the Senior Foreign Service.  Powell joined the United States Foreign Service in 1977, and has held assignments in Africa and South Asia.

Media reports conjectured that Powell's resignation was inevitable after the officials of the Government of India stopped accepting to meet her, following the Devyani Khobragade incident.

Previous positions
United States Ambassador to India, 2012-2014
Director General of the United States Foreign Service, 2009-2012
Ambassador to Nepal, July 16, 20072009
National Intelligence Officer for South Asia, National Intelligence Council, 2006–2007
Senior Coordinator for Avian Influenza and Infectious Diseases, 2006 (?)
Acting Assistant Secretary of State for the Bureau for International Narcotics and Law Enforcement Affairs, March 14November 25, 2005
Principal Deputy Assistant Secretary and the Acting Assistant Secretary of State for Legislative Affairs, November 2004March 2005
Ambassador to Pakistan,  August 9, 2002October 2004
Ambassador to Ghana, August 14, 2001May 2002
Acting Assistant Secretary for African Affairs, January 2001June 2001
Principal Deputy Assistant Secretary for African Affairs, July 1999January 2001
Ambassador to Uganda, 1997–1999
Deputy Chief of Mission at the U.S. Embassy in Dhaka, Bangladesh, 1995–1997
Political Counselor at the U.S. Embassy in New Delhi, India, 1993–1995
Consul General in Calcutta, India, 1992–1993
Deputy Chief of Mission in Lome, Togo, 1990–1992
Other overseas assignments have included Islamabad, Pakistan; Kathmandu, Nepal; and Ottawa, Canada; and previous Washington assignments were those of Nepal Desk Officer and Refugee Assistance Officer.

References

External links

Foreign Service Journal article on her Lifetime Contributions to American Diplomacy Award.

U.S. Embassy in Kathmandu, Nepal
Ask the Ambassador an online interactive forum with U.S. Ambassador to Nepal Nancy Powell, April 28, 2008

1947 births
Living people
Ambassadors of the United States to Ghana
Ambassadors of the United States to India
Ambassadors of the United States to Nepal
Ambassadors of the United States to Pakistan
Ambassadors of the United States to Uganda
People from Cedar Falls, Iowa
United States Career Ambassadors
American women ambassadors
United States Foreign Service personnel
Directors General of the United States Foreign Service
20th-century American diplomats
21st-century American diplomats
20th-century American women
21st-century American women